This is a list of public art in Atlanta, in the United States. This list applies only to works of public art on permanent display in an outdoor public space. For example, this does not include artworks in museums. Public art may include sculptures, statues, monuments, memorials, murals, and mosaics.

References 

Art in Atlanta
Atlanta
Atlanta
Public art